Steven "Steve" Luevano (born March 3, 1981) is an American former professional boxer who held the WBO featherweight title. He was trained by the former IBF Super Featherweight Champion Robert Garcia. He is remembered for his success inside the ring, with his only professional losses coming to Juan Manuel Lopez and Martin Honorio.

Amateur career 
Steven fought on the Mexican National amateur team. He is the 1997 National Jr. Olympic amateur champion at 119 pounds and had almost 300 amateur bouts before entering the pro ranks.

Pro career 
Luevano turned pro in 2000 and defeated many talented veterans including a win over future IBF Featherweight Champion Cristobal Cruz.

WBO Featherweight Championship 
On July 14, 2007, Luevano won the Vacant WBO Featherweight Championship by upsetting an undefeated and the future Super Featherweight WBO champion Nicky Cook by K.O.

On October 6, 2007, Steven Luevano (34-1, 15 KOs) defended his WBO Featherweight title, unanimously defeating 35-year-old Antonio "T-Rex" Davis (24-4) on the undercard of Manny Pacquiao and Marco Antonio Barrera. On March 15 Luevano defended his title magnificently against Thailands Terdsak Jandaeng (29-2-0) winning unanimously. In this pay-per-view fight he landed a featherweight boxing record for most jabs landed.

Even though Steven was born in the United States, he came to the ring with the Mexican flag instead, thus leading the boxing world to believe the fact that Luevano was a Mexican boxer.

Steven Luevano was tested in his 3rd defense against Mario Santiago on the David Diaz-Manny Pacquiao undercard at Mandalay Bay Events Center on June 28, 2008. Luevano retained his 126-pound belt via split draw against Santiago. Judge Harry Davis scored it 117-111 for Luevano, Duane Ford had it 115-113 for Santiago and Dave Moretti had it 114-114. ESPN.com also had it 114-114. Luevano landed 215 of 641 punches (34%) while Santiago connected on 214 of 835 (26%).

On October 18, 2008, Luevano defeated Billy Dib of Australia (21-0-0) for his 4th defense by unanimous decision.

On August 15, 2009, Luevano successfully defended his title for a 5th time via disqualification against Bernabe Concepcion (29-1-2). Luevano was ahead on the scorecards when Concepcion landed late blows after the bell at the end of the seventh round, resulting in Concepcion being disqualified.

Luevano ultimately lost his title on January 23, 2010, as he was stopped in the 7th round by former WBO junior bantamweight champion Juan Manuel Lopez. This was his only knockout loss.

Retirement 
While only 29 years old and still in his prime, Steven decided to retire from boxing, following his loss to Juan Manuel Lopez. During his professional career, Steven Luevano won the WBO NABO Super Bantamweight, WBC Continental Americas Featherweight, WBO NABO Featherweight, and made six defences of his WBO Featherweight Championship.

See also 
List of WBO world champions
List of Featherweight boxing champions
List of Mexican boxing world champions

References

External links 

 High School attended William Workman High School

American boxers of Mexican descent
World boxing champions
World featherweight boxing champions
World Boxing Organization champions
Super-featherweight boxers
Featherweight boxers
1981 births
Living people
American male boxers
People from La Puente, California